Isabel Rocío Ortiz Caniza (born 28 December 2001) is a Paraguayan footballer who plays as a goalkeeper for Club Sol de América and the Paraguay women's national team.

International career
Ortiz represented Paraguay at the 2018 FIFA U-20 Women's World Cup. She made her senior debut on 4 October 2019 in a 1–1 friendly draw against Venezuela.

References

2001 births
Living people
Women's association football goalkeepers
Paraguayan women's footballers
Paraguay women's international footballers
Pan American Games competitors for Paraguay
Footballers at the 2019 Pan American Games
Club Sol de América footballers
21st-century Paraguayan women